Étienne Edmond Foëx (8 June 1876, Montpellier – 29 October 1944 Paris) was a French botanist and phytopathologist.

Works

References

1876 births
1944 deaths
20th-century French botanists
19th-century French botanists